Dawson Holle is an American politician who has served in the North Dakota House of Representatives from the 31st district since 2023. Holle is the youngest elected lawmaker in the history of the state at age 19.

Career 
Holle announced his candidacy for former incumbent Jim Schmidt's seat in the 31st district on April 8, 2022. When Holle's candidacy was first announced, he was in his senior year at Mandan High School, and campaigned the rest of the school year.

On June 14, 2022, Holle won the Republican primary for District 31 alongside Karen Rohr with 33.9% of the vote.

Holle later won in the general election on November 8.

Holle was sworn in on December 1.

References 

21st-century American politicians
Date of birth missing (living people)
Living people
Republican Party North Dakota state senators